Moomin World is a theme park based on the Moomin books by Tove Jansson. It was designed by Dennis Livson, and located on the island of Kailo next to the old town of Naantali, in Southwest Finland.

The blueberry-coloured Moomin House is the main attraction of the park, where guests are allowed to go to all five storeys. Hemulen's house is located next to the Moomin House. It is also possible to go to, for example, Moominmamma's kitchen, the fire station, Snufkin's camp, and Moominpappa's boat. Visitors can also meet Moomin characters around the park or the Witch in her cottage.

Moomin World is not a traditional amusement park, as it does not have any rides. There are many activities and fantastical paths including Toffle's Path with the Witch's Labyrinth, The Hattifatteners' Cave and The Groke's House. There are also performances in the covered outdoor Moomin theatre Emma.

Moomin World is open daily from mid-June to mid-August. The nearby Väski Adventure Island is also a place to visit with attractions and activities for primary school children and adults as well.

Metsä in Japan is a Moomin theme park outside Finland. Metsä ('forest' in Finnish), was initially planned to start operation in 2015 for the 100th birth year of Tove Jansson, but on June 30, 2015, it was announced that it would open in 2017.  On December 6, 2016, the opening date was further delayed to spring 2019. Situated in Hanno city, northwest of Tokyo, the site includes a Moomin zone for attractions, and a free public zone or a park area. Construction site is purchased on hills along the Miyazawa reservoir.

Accolades 

Moomin World is the world's fourth best theme park for children according to The Independent on Sunday (October 2005). Moomin World was elected as the domestic travel destination of 2005 (Matkamessut, Finnish Travel Fair 2006). Moomin World got the Golden Pony Award 2007 by The Games & Parks Industry magazine. The jury said: "Moomin World is welcoming, well themed and full of educational content."

See also 
 Moomin Ice Cave
 Moomin Museum

References

External links 

 Moomin World Moomin Theme Park
 Facto Edizioni (publisher's site) The Games & Parks Industry magazine
 Emma Theatre Program at Emma Theatre
 My side of Naantali VIsitors' guide to Naantali

Amusement parks in Finland
Moomins
Naantali
Buildings and structures in Southwest Finland
Tourist attractions in Southwest Finland
Amusement parks opened in 1993
1993 establishments in Finland
ja:ムーミン#ムーミンワールド